Northumberland—Durham was a federal electoral district represented in the House of Commons of Canada from 1968 to 1979. It was located in the province of Ontario. This riding was created in 1966 from parts of Durham and Northumberland ridings.

It consisted of the County of Durham, the Townships of Alnwick, Haldimand, Hamilton, South Monaghan and Percy in the County of Northumberland, the Town of Cobourg and the Village of Hastings.

The electoral district was abolished in 1976 when it became part of Durham—Northumberland riding.

Members of Parliament

This riding has elected the following Members of Parliament:

Election results

|- 
  
|Liberal
|Russell Honey
|align="right"|  13,707   
  
|Progressive Conservative
|John Pratt
|align="right"| 11,141    
 
|New Democratic
|Wilmer J. Hill 
|align="right"|5,897   
|}

|- 
  
|Progressive Conservative
|Allan Lawrence
|align="right"| 17,385    
  
|Liberal
|Russell Honey  
|align="right"|14,594   
 
|New Democratic
|Wilmer Hill
|align="right"| 6,504   
|}

|- 
  
|Progressive Conservative
|Allan Lawrence
|align="right"|16,824    
  
|Liberal
|Allan Becket 
|align="right"| 14,896   
 
|New Democratic
|Russ Walker 
|align="right"| 7,136   
|}

See also 

 List of Canadian federal electoral districts
 Past Canadian electoral districts

External links 

 Website of the Parliament of Canada

Former federal electoral districts of Ontario